Frank LaFayette Anders (November 10, 1875 – January 23, 1966) was a United States Army soldier who received the Medal of Honor for actions during the Philippine–American War. He went on to become a noteworthy engineer, businessman, amateur military historian and politician.

Early years
Anders was born in Fort Abraham Lincoln, Dakota Territory, in what is now Fort Abraham Lincoln State Park, North Dakota. His father, formerly a Union Army soldier died of complications related to his wounds in 1890, and Anders, at age 15 began work with the Northern Pacific Railroad and became a machinist.

Active Service and war years
In 1894 Anders enlisted in the National Guard and after starting his second enlistment was deployed to the Philippines.

Medal and citation
On May 13, 1899, Anders was one of eleven men later awarded the medal for actions which took place against the Philippine Rebels. These men, part of Young's Scouts, caused 300 members of the enemy to retreat before their sudden charge. His medal was officially awarded on March 3, 1906.

Citation:

Post-war service and death
After returning to the United States in 1899, he worked for mining interests and in 1902, armed with only a seventh grade education and a few months at Dakota Business College (1895), he decided to attend Ripon College and after graduation in 1906 he became the first person awarded a scholarship  by the University of Wisconsin–Madison where he studied Civil Engineering and was initiated into Acacia fraternity in 1907, and was chief engineer with Utah Smelting Corporation from 1909 until 1920.

In 1918, he was commissioned  a captain in the Corps of Engineers and stationed in Fort Dodge, Iowa. In 1919 he was transferred to Fort Riley, where he was in charge of hospitals and also served in Washington, D.C., and at the Henry Ford Hospital in Michigan.

Major Anders died in 1966, and was the oldest surviving  recipient of the Medal of Honor at his death.

Marriage and personal life
In 1910, Anders married Mary Bertha Hargrave and had two children Franklin and Marion.

See also

List of Medal of Honor recipients
List of Philippine–American War Medal of Honor recipients

External links

1875 births
1966 deaths
United States Army Medal of Honor recipients
People from Morton County, North Dakota
United States Army officers
American military personnel of the Philippine–American War
Ripon College (Wisconsin) alumni
Philippine–American War recipients of the Medal of Honor
University of Wisconsin–Madison College of Engineering alumni